Ahlabaluhssin is a sub-district located in Khamir District, 'Amran Governorate, Yemen. Ahlabaluhssin had a population of 7824 according to the 2004 census.

References 

Sub-districts in Khamir District